Mariya Fedorivna Havrysh (12 June 1931 – 10 November 2001) was a Ukrainian swimmer. She was the first Soviet swimmer to reach an Olympic finals – at the 1952 Summer Olympics she finished sixth in the 200 m breaststroke. Between 1949 and 1955 she won 11 national titles (1949–1955) and set 19 national records in the 200 m breaststroke and 100 m butterfly events.

After marriage she changed her last name to Firsova. Since 1989, when masters competitions had been introduced in the Soviet Union, she competed in this category and won four national titles, setting two national records (1989–1991) in the 50 m and 100 m breaststroke. After breakup of the Soviet Union, she competed in Ukraine, winning four national titles in 1992–1993.

References

1931 births
2001 deaths
Ukrainian female breaststroke swimmers
Ukrainian female butterfly swimmers
Swimmers at the 1952 Summer Olympics
Soviet female breaststroke swimmers
Olympic swimmers of the Soviet Union
Soviet female butterfly swimmers
Sportspeople from Vinnytsia